Tea Pijević (born 18 November 1991) is a Croatian handball player for Alba Fehérvár KC and the Croatian national team.

She participated at the 2018 European Women's Handball Championship.

International honours
EHF Challenge Cup:
Winner: 2017

References

External links

1991 births
Living people
Sportspeople from Makarska
People from Ploče
Croatian female handball players
Expatriate handball players
Croatian expatriate sportspeople in Bosnia and Herzegovina
Croatian expatriate sportspeople in France
Croatian expatriate sportspeople in Hungary
Fehérvár KC players